The Black Lash is a 1952 American western film produced and directed by Ron Ormond and starring Lash LaRue and Al "Fuzzy" St. John. It was the eleventh of LaRue's films for Ormond's Western Adventures Productions Inc. The film was the fifth to be released by Howco, Ron Ormond's new film company composed of Ormond and drive-in movie owners Joy N. Houck and J. Francis White, and Ormond's second film as director. The  screenplay is credited to Ormond's wife June Carr and his infant (born 1950) son Timothy. The film is composed mostly of footage from previous Ormond LaRue Westerns with the majority of scenes taken from Frontier Revenge (1948) with Ray Bennett repeating his role as the released Duce Rago, making the film a sequel to that film.

Premise
Fuzzy finds himself separated from Lash who is posing as one of the Dalton Gang with undercover range detective Lem Woodruff. Fuzzy teams up with the pair to find themselves facing Duce Rago who has only served 6 months of a life sentence. In addition to taking on Duce's gang they set their sights on the justice system that let Duce loose.

Cast
Lash La Rue as Marshal Lash LaRue
Al St. John as Fuzzy Q. Jones
 Ray Bennett as Deuce Rago
Peggy Stewart as Joan Delysa
Kermit Maynard as 	Lem Woodruff
Byron Keith  as Bill Leonard
John L. Cason as	Cord
 Clarke Stevens as 	Johnson 
 Roy Butler  as 	Mayor Redfield
 Larry Barton as The Judge
 Cliff Taylor as Bartender 
 Bud Osborne as 	Telegrepher

References

External links

1952 films
American Western (genre) films
1952 Western (genre) films
American black-and-white films
1950s English-language films
Films directed by Ron Ormond
1950s American films